Phtheochroa palpana is a species of moth of the family Tortricidae. It is found in Asia Minor, northern Syria and Mesopotamia.

References

Moths described in 1894
Phtheochroa